Schistura procera is a species of ray-finned fish, a stone loach, in the genus Schistura. It has a wide distribution in the Nam Ou drainage, a tributary of the Mekong in Laos, where it occurs in a variety of flowing water habitats, from forest streams to waterfalls.

References

P
Fish described in 2000